The Northampton Sand Formation, sometimes called the Northamptonshire Sand, is a Middle Jurassic geological formation which is placed within the Inferior Oolite Group. It was formerly worked extensively in Northamptonshire for its ironstone.

The Northampton Sand Formation constitutes the lowest part of the Inferior Oolite Group and  lies on the upper Lias clay. In the south, it fades out around Towcester. Northward from the edge of the basin in the upper Lias, under Northampton, it lies progressively lower beneath the Jurassic Lincolnshire limestones. It fades out under north Lincolnshire as the strata rise towards the Market Weighton Axis.

The formation to dates to the Aalenian, and predominantly consists of sandy ironstone, which when freshly exposed is greenish-grey in colour, which weathers to limonitic brown sandstone. It formed in an extensive, shallow sea on the northwestern margin of the London-Brabant Massif. Dinosaur remains are among the fossils that have been recovered from the formation, although none have yet been referred to a specific genus. A species of horseshoe crab, Mesolimulus woodwardi has been described from the formation.

Commercial exploitation
There is a description of the twentieth century exploitation of the Northampton Sand for iron-smelting in the Wellingborough article.

See also 
 List of dinosaur-bearing rock formations
 List of stratigraphic units with indeterminate dinosaur fossils

References

Bibliography
Kent, P. & Gaunt, G.D. British Regional Geology Eastern England to The Wash (1980) 
Hains, B.A. & Horton, A. British Regional Geology Central England (1969) 
British Geological Survey 1:50 000 Series. Stamford. Sheet 157 Solid & Drift Edition (1978)

Aalenian Stage
Jurassic System of Europe